The 1923 County Championship was the 30th officially organised running of the County Championship. Yorkshire County Cricket Club won the championship title. Final placings were still decided by calculating the percentage of points gained against possible points available.

In May 1923, Jack Hobbs scored his 100th century in first-class cricket, batting for Surrey against Somerset.

Table
 Five points were awarded for a win.
 Two points were awarded for "winning" the first innings of a drawn match.
 Final placings were decided by calculating the percentage of possible points.

References

1923 in English cricket
County Championship seasons